Rittner is a surname. Notable people with the surname include:

Barbara Rittner (born 1973), German tennis player
Don Rittner, American historian, archeologist, environmental activist, educator and author
Günter Rittner (born 1927), German painter and illustrator
Horst Rittner (1930–2021), German correspondence chess grandmaster
Rudolf Rittner (1869–1943), German actor
Tadeusz Rittner (1873–1921), Polish dramatist, prose writer and literary critic

See also
Rittner Horn, Mountain in South Tyrol, Italy

References